Ishq Khuda ( "love of god") is a 2013 Pakistani Punjabi-language romantic film directed by Shahzad Rafique and produced by Shafquat Chaudhry. It stars Shaan Shahid, Meera, Saima, Ahsan Khan, Humaima Malick, Wiam Dahmani and Shafqat Cheema. The film was released on 9 August 2013 and was declared a commercial success.

Plot
Rulia (Shaan Shahid), a local hood, finds ishq-e-khuda (love of god) after he is "privileged" by the prayer of a Sufi dervish. In a parallel but unconnected arc Ahsan (Ahsan Khan), an engineer from Karachi, falls for Iqra (Meera) in a love triangle with Kulsoom (Wiam Dahmani), Iqra's childhood best friend, in love with for him.

Production
The production of the film started in Mianwali and Khoora, a village in the beautiful Soon Valley.

Music
The soundtrack album was composed by popular music director Wajahat Attray with lyrics written by Riaz ur Rehman Sagar. Rahat Fateh Ali Khan, Shazia Manzoor and Sanam Marvi sang all the songs for the film. A pre recorded song of Abida Parveen was used for the title track.

Release and reception
The film was released on 9 August 2013 across Pakistan with 35 prints. It clashed with Shah Rukh Khan's Chennai Express at the box office and, though successful, was completely crushed by it due to Pakistani cinemas preferring the Bollywood film over it.

Cast
 Shaan Shahid as Rulia
 Meera as Iqra
 Ahsan Khan as Ahsan
 Saima as Malka
 Shafqat Cheema
 Humaima Malick
 Wiam Dahmani as Kulsoom
 Inam Khan
 Zubair Ahmed Kumbher as Train Boy

Soundtrack

Awards
Winner- Abida Parveen-1st ARY Film Award for Best Female Playback Singer.
Nominated- Sanam Marvi-1st ARY Film Award for Best Female Playback Singer.
Nominated- -1st ARY Film Award for Best Film.
Nominated-Shahzad Rafique −1st ARY Film Award for Best Director.
Nominated-Ahsan Khan −1st ARY Film Award for Best Actor.
Nominated- Wajahat Attre  −1st ARY Film Award for Best Original Music

References

Red Carpet Review of "Ishq Khuda" from Canada: Ishq Khuda – A Mystic Love Story – ApnaHub.ca

External links 
 
 

2012 films
2012 romantic drama films
Punjabi-language Pakistani films
Pakistani romantic drama films
2010s Punjabi-language films